Bean van Limbeek (August 11, 1944–November 22, 2014) was a Dutch sport shooter. He competed at the 1988 Summer Olympics in the mixed trap event, in which he placed fifth.

References

1944 births
2014 deaths
Trap and double trap shooters
Dutch male sport shooters
Shooters at the 1988 Summer Olympics
Olympic shooters of the Netherlands